Landisville is an unincorporated community located within Buena Borough in Atlantic County, New Jersey, United States. The area is served as United States Postal Service ZIP code 08326.

As of the 2000 United States Census, the population for ZIP Code Tabulation Area 08326 was 1,280.

History
Charles K. Landis was a land developer who was the driving force behind the creation of Hammonton and Vineland. Landis also had a hand in establishing other small towns, including Landisville. He planned to make it county seat of a new county called Landis County, which would incorporate land from the surrounding counties. However, the locals were against this, and began calling him "King Landis".

Education
Buena Regional School District is the public school district, which operates Buena Regional High School.

Notre Dame Regional School of the Roman Catholic Diocese of Camden had one of its two campuses in Landisville, with the other in Newfield in Gloucester County. The school closed in 2012. It had 270 students at the time of closure. That year remnants of the school formed the non-Catholic Edgarton Christian Academy in Newfield. 263 of the former Notre Dame students moved to Edgarton.

Attractions
 Bellview Winery
 St. Padre Pio Shrine

References

External links

Census 2000 Fact Sheet for ZIP Code Tabulation Area 08326 from the United States Census Bureau

Buena, New Jersey
Unincorporated communities in Atlantic County, New Jersey
Unincorporated communities in New Jersey